Scott Andrew Mitchell (born 2 September 1985 in Ely, Cambridgeshire) is an English former professional footballer.

Playing career
Mitchell began his career with Ipswich Town, joining at the age of 10. He made his debut against Derby County in November 2003 and made four appearances for the first-team. He was not offered a new contract at the end of the 2005–06 season and joined Scottish First Division side Livingston in May 2006 on a two-year contract, where he made over 40 first-team appearances for the club. He joined Peterborough United on a short-term contract in January 2008 and made five appearances for Peterborough in Football League Two. He then joined Conference National side Rushden & Diamonds in June 2008. In August 2009, Mitchell joined the Suffolk coastal side Lowestoft Town playing in the Isthmian League Division One North. Mitchell was confirmed as signed for Leiston on 21 July 2014.

Later career
Mitchell joined his former club Ipswich Town as an academy coach in 2011. After retiring from playing, he became the Head of Academy Performance Analysis at Ipswich in 2016. In 2017, he became the club's Head of Academy Recruitment.

Career statistics
Source:

References

External links
Scott Mitchell profile at the Ipswich Town F.C. website

1985 births
Living people
People from Ely, Cambridgeshire
English footballers
Association football defenders
Ipswich Town F.C. players
Livingston F.C. players
Peterborough United F.C. players
Stevenage F.C. players
Rushden & Diamonds F.C. players
King's Lynn F.C. players
Lowestoft Town F.C. players
Leiston F.C. players
English Football League players
Scottish Football League players
Ipswich Town F.C. non-playing staff